Huangqi (Huang-ch’i) can refer to:

 Astragalus propinquus (syn. Astragalus membranaceus) (黄芪), an herb used in Chinese herbology

China 
 Huangqi, Xinfeng County, Guangdong (黄磜镇), town
 Huangqi, Fengning County (黄旗镇), town in Fengning Manchu Autonomous County, Hebei
 Huangqi, Lianjiang County, town in Lianjiang County, Fuzhou, Fujian
 Huangqi Peninsula, peninsula in Lianjiang County, Fuzhou, Fujian
 Lake Huangqi (黄旗海), Chahar Right Front Banner, Ulanqab Prefecture, Inner Mongolia, China.